NOM may refer to:

 National Organization for Marriage
 Natural organic matter
 New Order Mormons
 Nickelodeon Original Movies
 Nintendo Official Magazine, official British Nintendo magazine; now discontinued, superseded by Official Nintendo Magazine
 NOM and NOM2, mobile device games produced by Gamevil
 N.O.M., an experimental Russian rock band
 Nominative case
 Norma Oficial Mexicana, stylized as:  - each of a series of official norms and regulations for various commercial activities in México. 
 Nosara Airport, airport code NOM, in Nosara, Costa Rica
 Novus Ordo Missae, Mass of Paul VI

Nom may refer to:
 Nôm, a classical vernacular script of the Vietnamese language that makes use of Chinese characters
 Nộm, Vietnamese salad
 Finrod Felagund, a character from J.R.R. Tolkien's Silmarillion, also known as Nóm
 Nóm the Wise, a song about Finrod Felagund by Blind Guardian from their 1998 album Nightfall in Middle-Earth
 Because nom is French for "name" (see: Pseudonym):
 Nom de plume, "name of the pen", a pseudonym adopted by an author.  
 Nom d'amour, "name of love", a hypocorism -- the shortening of one's normal name into a pet name.  
 Nom de guerre, "name of war", a pseudonym adopted by an insurgent.  
 Nom de felonie, "name of crime", a pseudonym adopted by a criminal.  
 Nom de héroïque, "name of [a] hero", a pseudonym adopted by a hero.  
 Nomination, to be named as a candidate
 "Nom", a song by Dongkiz
 "Om nom nom" (or Nom-Nom-ing), onomatopoeia used to represent eating, first used by Cookie Monster

See also
 Nome (disambiguation)
 Nominal (disambiguation)